Patricia Klous (born October 19, 1948) is a retired American television actress and former model, best known for her roles as stewardess Marcy Bower on the CBS TV series Flying High (1978–79) and as cruise director Judy McCoy on the ABC sitcom The Love Boat (1984–1986).

Career biography
Klous began her career in the 1970s as a successful model in New York City after graduating with a bachelor of science in biology and psychology from the University of Texas.  In New York, executive producer Mark Carliner cast her opposite Connie Sellecca and Katherine Witt (who were also New York City-based models) in the CBS prime-time comedy-drama Flying High (1978–79) about the misadventures of three young flight attendants at the fictional Sun West Airlines. Despite high ratings in the beginning, the series eventually failed and was cancelled four months after it debuted. Klous did occasional television work afterwards during the early 1980s.

Klous portrayed Fran Linhart in the ABC-TV comedy Aloha Paradise (1981). In 1984, the producers of the long-running ABC sitcom The Love Boat tapped Klous to replace actress Lauren Tewes when Tewes was dropped from the show. On The Love Boat, Klous portrayed Judy McCoy, the sister and successor of Tewes' character as cruise director. She remained with the series until it ended in 1986. Klous retired from acting in 2002.

Filmography

References

External links

1948 births
Living people
20th-century American actresses
American television actresses
Female models from Kansas
Models from New York City
Actresses from Kansas
Actresses from New York City
University of Texas alumni
People from Hutchinson, Kansas
21st-century American women